The 1954 World Men's Handball Championship was the second team handball World Championship. It was held in Sweden from 13–17 January 1954, and the hosts also won the championship.

Qualification

Group A

Group B

Finals

5th–6th-place match

Bronze-medal match

Final match

Final standings

Medalists

References
Source: 
 International Handball Federation
 Games of Sweden
 Games of Germany (Helmut Laaß and Stephan Müller)

World Handball Championship tournaments
H
H
International handball competitions hosted by Sweden
World Men's Handball Championship
International sports competitions in Gothenburg
World Men's Handball Championship, 1954